Oleksiy Khlopotnov (born 17 August 1946) is a Ukrainian sprinter. He competed in the men's 100 metres at the 1968 Summer Olympics representing the Soviet Union.

References

1946 births
Living people
Athletes (track and field) at the 1968 Summer Olympics
Ukrainian male sprinters
Olympic athletes of the Soviet Union
Place of birth missing (living people)
Soviet male sprinters